Hakim Adi is a British historian and scholar who specializes in African affairs. He is the first African-British historian to become a professor of history in the UK. He has written widely on Pan-Africanism and the modern political history of Africa and the African diaspora, including the 2018 book Pan-Africanism: A History. Currently a professor at the University of Chichester, Adi is an advocate of the education curriculum in the UK, both at secondary school and higher education level, being changed to reflect the history of Africa and the African diaspora, including the contribution of African people to world history.

Career
Adi obtained a BA and his PhD in African history from the School of Oriental and African Studies (SOAS), London University, and has described himself as "a late developer into higher education.... I've taught history at every level you can imagine: schools, prison, adult education, further education, university. I've taught in Broadmoor, Strangeways — you name it, I've done it...". He was Reader in the History of Africa and the African Diaspora at Middlesex University for many years until the department of history was closed down. He currently lectures in African History at the University of Chichester, West Sussex, and is one of the few African British academics to become recognised as a professor. He supervised the master of research thesis of the Nigerian human rights activist, Ibrahim B. Anoba at the University of Chichester in 2020.

He was a founder member in 1991 of the Black and Asian Studies Association (BASA), which he chaired for several years.

He also leads the History Matters group, a collection of academics and teachers concerned with the under-representation of students and teachers of African and Caribbean heritage within the History discipline. In 2015 the group convened the History Matters conference of the same name held at the Institute of Historical Research.

Writings
Adi has written widely on Pan-Africanism and on the history of the African diaspora, particularly Africans in Britain. He is the author of the books West Africans in Britain 1900–1960: Nationalism, Pan-Africanism and Communism (1998), Pan-Africanism and Communism: The Communist International, Africa and the Diaspora, 1919–1939 (2013), and the joint author (with Marika Sherwood) of The 1945 Manchester Pan-African Congress Revisited (1995) and Pan-African History: Political Figures from Africa and the Diaspora since 1787 (2003). Reviewing Adi's 2018 book, Pan-Africanism: A History, Adom Getachew wrote: "Few scholars are better positioned than Adi to chart Pan-Africanism’s history: Over the course of two decades, he has chronicled it and the modern black experience more broadly as the writer or editor of 11 books, not to mention many journal articles and chapters written for other books. In Pan-​Africanism, he brings to bear his encyclopedic knowledge of black freedom movements in Africa, the Americas, and Europe."

Adi has also written history books for children, including The History of the African and Caribbean Communities in Britain (2005).

Film work 
Hakim Adi featured (alongside Maulana Karenga, Muhammed Shareef, Francis Cress Welsin, Kimani Nehusi, Paul Robeson Jr, and Nelson George) in the multi-award-winning documentary 500 Years Later (2005), written by M. K. Asante, Jr. and directed by Owen 'Alik Shahadah.

Selected bibliography

Books 

 African Migrations, Thomson Learning, 1994. 
 With Marika Sherwood, The 1945 Manchester Pan-African Congress Revisited, London: New Beacon Books, 1995. 
 West Africans in Britain 1900–1960: Nationalism, Pan-Africanism and Communism, London: Lawrence & Wishart, 1998. 
 With Marika Sherwood, Pan-African History: Political Figures from Africa and the Diaspora since 1787, London/New York: Routledge: 2003. 
 The History of the African and Caribbean Communities in Britain, Wayland, 2005. . Paperback 2014, 
 Co-editor with Caroline Bressey, Belonging in Europe – The African Diaspora and Work, London: Routledge, 2010. 
 Pan-Africanism and Communism: The Communist International, Africa and the Diaspora, 1919–1939, Trenton, New Jersey, USA: Africa World Press, 2013. 
 Pan-Africanism: A History, Bloomsbury Academic, 2018. 
 African and Caribbean People in Britain, Allen Lane, 2022.

Articles 
 "A New Kind of Imperialism", Radical History Review, Issue 95: "New Imperialisms", Spring 2006. Workers' Daily Internet Edition 
 "London, slavery and abolition", BBC, 2007.
 "The wider historical context of the abolition of the transatlantic slave trade", Pambazuka News, Issue 302, 2 May 2007.
 "George Padmore and the 1945 Manchester Pan-African Congress", in Fitzroy Baptiste and Rupert Lewis (eds), George Padmore: Pan-African Revolutionary, Kingston, JA: Ian Randle, 2009.
 "To What Extent is Britain Post-Colonial?", E-International Relations, 3 October 2012.
 "The New Scramble for Africa", E-International Relations, 15 April 2013.
 "Britain’s black history has been shamefully whitewashed" (review of Black and British: A Forgotten History by David Olusoga), The Spectator, 14 January 2017.

References

External links 
 Official website.
Development and Modern African Political Theory
 Hakim Adi, "London, slavery and abolition", BBC, 24 September 2014.
 "Dr Hakim Adi - New Scramble for Africa", YouTube.
 Hakim Adi, "Africa and the Transatlantic Slave Trade", History, BBC, 2012.
 Hakim Adi at Academia.edu
 "Pan-Africanism and Communism: an Interview with Hakim Adi", Review of African Political Economy, 26 January 2017.
 "An Interview with YHP's founder Hakim Adi", AAIHS, 16 July 2017.
 "I was the first person of African heritage to become a professor of history in Britain, which shows that we have a long way to go", Black Cultural Archives, 12 August 2019.
Hakim Adi at Twitter

 "

21st-century British male writers
Academics of Middlesex University
Academics of the University of Chichester
Alumni of SOAS University of London
Black British academics
Black British writers
British historians
British pan-Africanists
British television presenters
Historians of Africa
Living people
Year of birth missing (living people)